Ermenegildo Zegna (born 30 September 1955), often simply known and referred to as Gildo Zegna, is an Italian entrepreneur and manager. He is Chairman and CEO of Ermenegildo Zegna Group.

Early life and education 
Gildo is a grandson of Ermenegildo Zegna, who founded the family business in 1910.
Gildo Zegna was born in Turin in 1955. His father Angelo, who had run the business since the mid-1960s with his brother Aldo, was the Company's honorary chairman until his death in 2021.

Gildo Zegna graduated in economics from the University of London in 1978. In 1981, he attended a managerial program at the Harvard Business School.

Career 
Gildo Zegna entered the family business in 1982, managing the distribution of Zegna products in the U.S. and Canada as President of Ermenegildo Zegna Corporation.

From 1986 to 1989 he served as CEO of Italco SA, supervising the distribution of Zegna products in Spain.

Gildo Zegna has been a board member of Ermenegildo Zegna Group since 1989, becoming chief executive officer in 1997. Under his guide, together with his cousin Paolo Zegna, the label has undertaken a strategy of full verticalization and brand extension. The Zegna Group took over the high-end textile manufacturer Bonotto in 2016; the historic Cappellificio Cervo hat-maker and the American label Thom Browne in 2018; the Italian high-quality jersey fabrics manufacturer Dondi in 2019; the fabric makers Tessitura Ubertino and Tessitura Biagioli Modesto in 2021.

In addition to running the Zegna Group, Gildo Zegna is also Chairman of the board of directors of Thom Browne Inc. and a board member of Tom Ford International. He is also Chairman of Filati Biagioli Modesto. He served as a board member of Fiat Chrysler Automobiles NV from 2014 to 2018. Gildo Zegna is a member of the Council for the United States and Italy and of the Camera Nazionale della Moda italiana.

Awards and honors
Gildo Zegna was awarded the title Knight of Labour (Cavaliere del lavoro) in 2011 by Italian president Giorgio Napolitano.

In 2016, he  received the Leonardo Prize from Italian President Sergio Mattarella, a prestigious award given to an Italian personality who has acted in a significant way to promote the image of Italy in the world.

Personal life
He is married with two sons.

Honours 

 Knight of the Order of Merit for Labour (2011)

References 

Living people
Italian businesspeople
1955 births
Alumni of the University of London
Recipients of the Order of Merit for Labour